GeoAlliance Canada is an Umbrella organization founded in 2015. The organization addresses sector-wide strategic priorities by pooling the energy and resources of existing Canadian business, non-profit, academia and government organizations in the Geomatics sector.

History 

GeoAlliance Canada was formed by the Canadian Gemoatics Community Round Table, a collaborative group of professionals from all fields of Geomatics. The group  met regularly to consider the challenges that the industry would be facing in the upcoming years, propose solutions and strategies that could help guide the direction of the sector and strengthen it for the years to come. Seven strategy dimensions were used to create the Pan-Canadian Geomatics Strategy document with input from the geospatial community that helped the strategy development process, leading to the formation of GeoAlliance Canada.

References

External links
 GeoAlliance Canada Official site
 Canadian Geomatics Community Round Table
 Canadian Geomatics Community Round Table & the Pan-Canadian Geomatics Strategy

Scientific organizations based in Canada
Geomatics organizations
Surveying of Canada